Caroline Elizabeth Johnson (née Burton; born 31 December 1977) is a British Conservative Party politician and consultant paediatrician who served as Parliamentary Under-Secretary of State for Mental Health and Public Health from September to October 2022. She has been the Member of Parliament (MP) for Sleaford and North Hykeham since the 2016 by-election.

Early life and education
Caroline Elizabeth Burton was born on 31 December 1977 in Middlesbrough, England, to Len and Lynda Burton. She attended Gordonstoun, a private school in Moray, Scotland. She graduated from Newcastle University Medical School in 2001. Johnson became a senior house officer in 2002, a paediatrics specialist registrar in 2005;, and a consultant in 2012.

Political career

She contested the Scunthorpe seat in the 2010 general election, coming second to the Labour candidate Nic Dakin.
In the June 2016 European Union membership referendum, Johnson voted for Brexit.

Later in the year, a by-election was called in the Sleaford and North Hykeham constituency after the resignation of its MP Stephen Phillips following differences between him and the government on Brexit. Johnson was selected by the Conservative Party to contest the seat in the December by-election.

In the by-election she was elected as MP with 17,570 (53.5%) votes and a majority of 13,144. Johnson retained her seat in the 2017 general election with 42,245 votes (64.2%) and a majority of 25,237. Following the election, she was chosen to be part of the Health and Social Care Select Committee and the Environment, Food and Rural Affairs Committee. She served on the Health and Social Care Select Committee until February 2018 and Environment, Food and Rural Affairs Committee until November 2019. Johnson also chairs the All Party Parliamentary Groups (APPG) for Children who need Palliative Care.

She is a member of the European Research Group. Johnson voted for then Prime Minister Theresa May's Brexit withdrawal agreement and against any referendum on a withdrawal agreement in early 2019. She supported Boris Johnson in the 2019 Conservative Party leadership election. Following his election as prime minister, she voted for his Brexit withdrawal agreement in October 2019. She was re-elected in the December general election with an increased majority of 32,565 (48.9%) votes, the largest majority won by any Conservative candidate at the election. She was a member of the Education Select Committee between March 2020 and October 2022. Johnson rejoined the Health and Social Care Select Committee in November 2022.

During the July 2022 United Kingdom government crisis, Johnson resigned as the Vice Chair of the Conservative Party on 7 July, after over 50 previous resignations of MPs and ministers, criticising then Prime Minister Boris Johnson's "errors of judgement" and calling for his resignation. After the election of Liz Truss as prime minister in September 2022, she was appointed as a Parliamentary Under-Secretary of State in the Department of Health and Social Care. Following Truss' resignation, she supported Johnson's bid to return as PM in the October 2022 Conservative Party leadership election.

Personal life
Caroline has been married to Nik Johnson in 2001 and they have three children. He works as a farmer and businessman. They live in Sudbrook, Lincolnshire. In addition to her parliamentary duties, she continues to work part-time as a consultant paediatrician in Peterborough City Hospital and earns a salary of £21,199.20 for 336 hours annually as of February 2023.

References

External links

1977 births
Living people
Alumni of Newcastle University
21st-century British medical doctors
British paediatricians
English women medical doctors
Conservative Party (UK) MPs for English constituencies
People educated at Gordonstoun
Female members of the Parliament of the United Kingdom for English constituencies
People from South Kesteven District
UK MPs 2015–2017
UK MPs 2017–2019
UK MPs 2019–present
Women pediatricians
21st-century British women politicians
People from Middlesbrough
21st-century women physicians
21st-century English women
21st-century English people
British Eurosceptics